Luís Miguel Fastudo e Costa (born 7 June 1978 in Benguela) is a former Angolan professional basketball player. He played for C.R.D. Libolo at the Angolan major basketball league BIC Basket until 2015. He is a former member of the Angola national basketball team. He represented Angola at the 2006 FIBA World Championship, the FIBA Africa Championship 2007 and the 2008 Summer Olympics.

References

External links
 

1978 births
Living people
Angolan expatriate basketball people in Portugal
Angolan men's basketball players
Basketball players at the 2008 Summer Olympics
Olympic basketball players of Angola
People from Benguela
Atlético Petróleos de Luanda basketball players
C.R.D. Libolo basketball players
Small forwards
2006 FIBA World Championship players